Rhachiocephalidae is an extinct family of dicynodont therapsids. It includes two genera from the Late Permian of southern Africa, Rhachiocephalus and Kitchinganomodon. Rhachiocephalids were the largest dicynodonts in the Permian, although the kannemeyeriiform dicynodonts of the Late Triassic grew to larger sizes. Rhachiocephalids are also unusual in that they have long, low skulls.

References

Dicynodonts
Lopingian first appearances
Lopingian extinctions
Prehistoric therapsid families